Overland Corner is a locality in the Australian state of South Australia located in the state’s east about  north-east of the state capital of Adelaide and about  west of the municipal seat in Berri.

It is located on the Murray River in the Riverland area of South Australia, near Barmera and Cobdogla.  The area had traditionally been used as an aboriginal camping ground and was then used by drovers taking stock from New South Wales to Adelaide.

When the New South Wales gold rush began in 1851, Overland Corner developed as a point where timber was supplied to fuel paddle steamers taking prospectors up the Murray River. A small police post was established in Overland Corner in 1855, built by Edward Bate Scott. It closed in 1894.  A school was opened and remained open until at least 1904.

The historic Overland Corner Hotel was built in 1859. It closed in 1897 but still stands, reopened in 1965, at the centre of what is now the National Trust of South Australia's Overland Corner Reserve. It is listed on the South Australian Heritage Register.

Boundaries were created on 12 August 1999 for the "long established name" which included the former Overland Corner Shack Site  and  the former Lock 3 Shack Site.  On 26 April 2013, "unincorporated land" was added to the locality.

The 2016 Australian census which was conducted in August 2016 reports that Overland Corner had a population of 50 people.

Pooginook is located within the federal division of Barker, the state electoral district of Chaffey and the local government areas of the Berri Barmera Council and the Pastoral Unincorporated Area.

References

External links
 Includes map of the reserve

Riverland
Towns in South Australia
Places in the unincorporated areas of South Australia